Sakhi (also Romanized as Sakhī) is a village in Hoseynabad Rural District, in the Central District of Shush County, Khuzestan Province, Iran. At the 2006 census, its population was 649, in 96 families.

References 

Populated places in Shush County